The Dogtown Poetry Theater was a short-lived but influential venue in mid-Seventies Seattle. Organized by Don Wilsun and Joe Scozzy as a grass-roots outlet for poetic expression across cultural and societal boundaries, it became an alternative to the academic reading series controlled ("captive" was the Dogtown term for it) by University of Washington professor Nelson Bentley.

Dogtown featured free readings every Sunday afternoon in a vacant space below Seattle's signature Pike Place Market, a large space featuring one wall of windows giving views of the generally rainy and gray Puget Sound, a pot-bellied iron stove to drive the chill and damp away for readings and heat the pot of free Market Spice tea, and a piano. Readings were often attended by winos seeking heat and a free cup of wine, tourists who wandered down from the Market, poetry fans, and a cadre of restless young Seattle poets who found the open atmosphere liberating and challenging.

Many authors read at Dogtown, including Steven "Jesse" Bernstein, a multi-published legend who toured with punk groups and recorded albums on the same SubPop label that brought Nirvana to the world. Other poets who contributed heavily to the rich aural adventure of Dogtown and went on to future writing of note were Charlie Burks, Charlie Burks, the coordinator of the first Bumbershoot Writers in Performance Competition in 1981, Britt Robson, Hans Skott-Myre, Linton Robinson, Cliff Finity, and Don Wilsun, who founding the Red Sky Poetry Theatre in continuance of the Dogtown tradition.

Dogtown's impact lingered, but its performances only took place for a little over a year, from 1975 to 1976. The material presented there was as eclectic as is possible to get: wino blitherings, romance poems by starry-eyed ingénues, strict academic forms, and performance art (such as playing recordings of conversations in Market bars while passing around samples of trash and cigarette butts gleaned from the tables where they were taped). But the general feel tended towards a sort of retro-beat aesthetic. Tom Waits and Patty Smith were cited as influences by many of the poets mentioned above, as well as Burroughs, Bukowski, and other denizens of the twilight zones between beat, hip, and grunge.

The readings ceased in 1976 and Red Sky quickly emerged from the ashes to have a more enduring effect. But Dogtown was an important part of the poetic blast of that time, dovetailing in with SubPop and other grunge, Eidolon, precursors of The Stranger in forging a verbal esthetic that was more influential on Eighties and Nineties culture than is widely known.

References

 Answers.com Stephen Jesse Bernstein bio: influence of Dogtown cited
 International Youth Care Network Dogtown as ethos, bridge to punk culture
 Brock University Newspaper Skott-Mayre's youth work, Dogtown inspiration

Culture of Seattle
Pike Place Market
Poetry organizations